Bayu Gatra Sanggiawan (born 11 November 1991) is an Indonesian professional footballer who plays as a winger for Liga 1 club Madura United.

Personal life
Bayu Gatra was born to Lucky Supriya and Siti Holifah. He never fully went to school as a child and initially took up football as a career to help his family. He credits coach Rudy Keltjes for helping him recover from a knee injury. Bayu Gatra is a devout Muslim.

International career 
Gatra won his first cap for Indonesia in a friendly match against Andorra on March 26, 2014.

Career statistics

International

International goals
Bayu Gatra: International under-23 goals

Honours

Clubs
Persisam U-21
 Indonesia Super League U-21 runner-up: 2012
PSM Makassar
 Piala Indonesia: 2019

Country honors
Indonesia U-23
 Islamic Solidarity Games  Silver medal: 2013
 Southeast Asian Games  Silver medal: 2013
Indonesia
 AFF Championship runner-up: 2016

References

External links
 
 Bayu Gatra at Liga Indonesia

1992 births
Living people
Indonesian Muslims
People from Jember Regency
Sportspeople from East Java
Indonesian footballers
Liga 1 (Indonesia) players
Persisam Putra Samarinda players
Bali United F.C. players
Madura United F.C. players
PSM Makassar players
Indonesia international footballers
Footballers at the 2014 Asian Games
Indonesia youth international footballers
Association football midfielders
Southeast Asian Games silver medalists for Indonesia
Southeast Asian Games medalists in football
Competitors at the 2013 Southeast Asian Games
Asian Games competitors for Indonesia
21st-century Indonesian people